Rush Holt Sr. (1905–1955) was a U.S. Senator from West Virginia from 1935 to 1941. Senator Holt may also refer to:

David Holt (politician) (born 1979), Oklahoma State Senate
Elmer Holt (1884–1945), Montana State Senate
Hines Holt (1805–1865), Georgia State Senate
Jim Holt (Arkansas politician) (born 1965), Arkansas State Senate